Mohamad Nizar bin Mohamad Najib (born 11 May 1978) is a Malaysian politician who has served as Member of the Pahang State Executive Council (EXCO) in the Barisan Nasional (BN) state administration under Menteri Besar Wan Rosdy Wan Ismail since December 2022 and Member of the Pahang State Legislative Assembly (MLA) for Peramu Jaya since November 2022. He is a member of the United Malays National Organisation (UMNO), a component party of the BN coalition. He is also the son of Najib Razak, the 6th and former Prime Minister.

Political career
He was UMNO Youth Chief of Jalan Daud Branch, Kampung Baru zone in Titiwangsa.

Nizar is the UMNO Youth Chief of Pekan since 2018.

He has been coined as a potential Barisan Nasional candidate of the 2020 Chini by-election, before the party decided to nominate Mohd Sharim Md Zain. In the 2022 Malaysian general election, after speculation that Nizar might be contesting his first election in Pekan in place of his father, who has recently sentenced to jail, he instead were selected by his party to contest the state seat of Peramu Jaya in the 2022 Pahang state election. He won the seat, defeating 3 other candidates with a majority of 7,823 votes.

In the Pahang coalition government between BN and Pakatan Harapan after the 2022 election, Nizar was appointed state EXCO member under portfolio of investment, industries, science, technology and innovation.

Personal life
Nizar is the son of the sixth Prime Minister of Malaysia, Datuk Seri Najib Tun Razak with his first wife, Tengku Puteri Zainah Tengku Eskandar. He is the eldest of five siblings, including the two children of Najib's second wife Rosmah Mansor. His younger brother Nazifuddin Najib is a businessman and secretary-general of Olympic Council of Malaysia (OCM) since 2018.

He has worked as a consultant and accountant, residing in Jalan Maktab, Kuala Lumpur. He is married to Nur Sharmila Shaheen, the daughter of Wanita UMNO exco member Maznah Hamid in 2004, with five children. 

On 18 November 2020, Nizar was ordered to pay RM13.16 million in unpaid taxes from 2011 to the Malaysia Inland Revenue Board by the Shah Alam High Court.

Election results

Honours 
  :
  Knight Companion of the Order of Sultan Ahmad Shah of Pahang (DSAP) – Dato' (2016)

Notes

References 

1978 births
Members of the Pahang State Legislative Assembly
Living people
Malaysian people of Malay descent
Malaysian Muslims
Children of prime ministers of Malaysia